

Incumbents
Monarch: Hans

Events

Arts and literature

Births
Jens Olavssøn Bratt, clergyman (d. 1548)

Deaths
Nils Ravaldsson, rebel leader of Alvsson's rebellion